Daithí Carroll (born 1987) is a Gaelic footballer for Laois.

He plays club football for his local club The Heath and previously played for Laois. He was regarded as one of the county's best young forwards and was introduced to the senior panel during the National League Final 2011 but has not played for the county team since that year.

References

1987 births
Living people
Laois inter-county Gaelic footballers
The Heath Gaelic footballers